The Synod of Kells took place in 1152, under the presidency of Giovanni Cardinal Paparoni, and continued the process begun at the Synod of Ráth Breasail (1111) of reforming the Irish church. The sessions were divided between the abbeys of Kells and Mellifont, and in later times the synod has been called the Synod of Kells-Mellifont and the Synod of Mellifont-Kells.

Its main effect was to increase the number of archbishops from two to four, and to redefine the number and size of dioceses. The Primacy of Ireland was granted to the Archdiocese of Armagh.

Background
Máel Máedóc Ua Morgair (Saint Malachy) was made a priest in 1119, as vicar to Celsus. His first sees were Down and Connor, and he was located at Bangor Abbey. On the death of Celsus in 1129, Malachy was nominated as his successor at Armagh, now the prime see in Ireland. An internal church dispute over the succession and proposals for reform obliged him to concede the position to Gelasius. In 1137, Gelasius, lacking papal confirmation of the appointment of Malachy by Rome asked him to secure the archbishop's pallium at the hands of the Pope or his legate. Malachy reached Rome but the Pope, Innocent II, would only grant the pallia to Malachy at the request of an Irish National Synod. To facilitate this, he made Malachy his papal legate. Malachy then returned to Ireland accompanied by a number of Cistercian monks provided by St. Bernard.

The Synod of Kells
In 1148 a synod of bishops was assembled at Inispatric. Malachy set out on a second journey to Rome, but died on the way at Clairvaux, France, in November. A synod was summoned to Kells in 1152. This synod approved the consecration of four archbishops. Tairrdelbach Ua Conchobair, the High King of Ireland, approved the decrees, and the pallia were conferred by the Papal Legate, Giovanni Cardinal Paparoni (also known as John Cardinal Paparo).

Ireland was divided into thirty-six sees, and four metropolitan sees: Armagh, Cashel, Tuam, and Dublin. Armagh was granted Primacy (see Primacy of Ireland). The diocese of Dublin, ruled by the Ostmen (Hiberno-Norse), seceded from Canterbury and was united with Glendalough. Gregory, the incumbent bishop, accepted the new title and Ostman separatism came to an end.

The diocesan system
The diocesan system was further reorganised, with the number of metropolitan provinces being increased from two to four, by raising the dioceses of Dublin and Tuam to archdioceses. The four provinces of Armagh, Cashel, Dublin and Tuam corresponded to the contemporary boundaries of the provinces of Ulster, Munster, Leinster and Connacht respectively.

In most cases the dioceses corresponded with the territories controlled by the Irish clans, and the clan chiefs liked to appoint family members as bishops, nuns and church officials. 

The diocesan structure established by the synod largely survived until the sixteenth century, and still forms the basis of the territorial structure of both the Catholic Church and the Church of Ireland, with many of the sees now merged.

Provinces and dioceses

Province of Armagh
Ardagh: reduced in size by creation of Diocese of Kells
Armagh
Clonard: confirmed as see for East Meath
Connor
Dar-Luis: status of area uncertain
Down
Duleek
Kells: established as see for the Kingdom of Breifne. Absorbed by Diocese of Meath in 1211
Louth: see moved from Clogher and area extended at the expense of Armagh. See returned to Clogher by 1192
Maghera: see transferred to Derry in 1254
Raphoe: created in the late 12th century subsequent to the synod

Province of Cashel
Ardfert: lost territory to Scattery Island
Cashel
Cloyne: formed from part of Cork
Cork: lost territory to Cloyne and Ross
Emly
Kilfenora: formed from part of Diocese of Killaloe; corresponded with the sub-kingdom of Corco Mruiad
Killaloe: lost territory to new dioceses of Kilfenora, Roscrea and Scattery Island
Limerick: lost territory to Scattery Island
Lismore: formed from part of Waterford
Roscrea: formed from part of Killaloe, only existed until the 1160s
Ross: formed from part of Cork
Scattery Island: formed from parts of Ardfert, Killaloe and Limerick. Incorporated into Limerick by end of 12th century
Waterford: lost territory to create Lismore

Province of Dublin
Dublin
Ferns
Glendalough: united to Dublin in 1216
Kildare
Kilkenny
Leighlin

Province of Tuam
Achonry
Clonfert
Killala
Kilmacduagh
Mayo: merged with Tuam 1209
Roscommon moved to Elphin 1156
Tuam
Annaghdown was created circa 1179

See also
Synod of Ráth Breasail (1111)
Synod of Cashel (1172)

Notes

Sources
 Peter Galloway, The Cathedrals of Ireland, Belfast 1992
 
 Geoffrey Keating. Foras Feasa Book I–II Geoffrey Keating.  The History of Ireland Part 91 of The History of Ireland

External links
 The Dioceses of Ireland, Territorial History (Rootsweb)

1152 in Ireland
Christianity in medieval Ireland
History of County Meath
History of County Louth
Kells-Mellifont
Kells